ARMC may refer to:

 Alamance Regional Medical Center
 ARMC5
 ARMC6
 Arrowhead Regional Medical Center